The House of Ruffo di Calabria is one of the longest-standing noble families in Italy. It was already one of the seven most important houses of the Kingdom of Naples; their notable members include Rembrandt's patron Antonio Ruffo, the flying ace Fulco Ruffo di Calabria and his daughter Paola Ruffo di Calabria, queen-consort of Albert II of Belgium.

See also 
 Castello Ruffo di Scilla
 Castello Ruffo di Amendolea
 Castello Ruffo di Nicotera
 Palazzo Ruffo della Scaletta

References